Richard Anthony Moore (January 23, 1914 – January 27, 1995) was an American lawyer and communications executive, who served as special counsel to President Richard Nixon and was United States Ambassador to Ireland (1989–1992).

Moore became a special counsel to President Nixon in 1971, and in July 1973 was a witness to the Senate committee investigating the Watergate scandal. After leaving the administration he later became founder and associate producer of The McLaughlin Group, and was later ambassador to Ireland under President George H. W. Bush. His brother, John D. J. Moore, had served as ambassador to Ireland under Presidents Nixon and Ford. Moore died of prostate cancer in Washington, D.C., in 1995.

References

External links
Richard Anthony Moore profile at history.state.gov

1914 births
1995 deaths
Ambassadors of the United States to Ireland
Yale Law School alumni
20th-century American businesspeople
United States Army soldiers
United States Army personnel of World War II
Deaths from prostate cancer